Erik Helland (born May 16, 1980) is a lawyer and a former Republican member of the Iowa House of Representatives.  He represented the 69th district, which includes Grimes, Johnston, Polk City, Saylorville, Alleman, Elkhart, and parts of Sheldahl, from 2009 to 2013.  He was the state director for Tim Pawlenty's 2012 presidential campaign in Iowa.

Early life and career
Erik Helland grew up on his family's farm.  He graduated from Ballard High School and then went on to earn his undergraduate degree in biochemistry and molecular biology and his Juris Doctor from Drake University.  He works for a bank as a compliance officer.  He is a former president of the Grimes Lions club and a former board member of the Des Moines Young Variety.  He attends St. Peter’s Lutheran Church.

Political career
Erik Helland was an Iowa field staffer for John McCain's 2008 presidential campaign.  In 2008, he decided to run to represent the 69th district in the Iowa House of Representatives.  He faced Richard Sosalla in the general election and won with 61% of the vote.  He was re-elected in 2010 without opposition.  He was the Midwest political director for former New York Governor George Pataki’s 21st Century Political Action Committee.  He was the Iowa state director for Tim Pawlenty's 2012 presidential campaign.  He was also the majority whip in the Iowa House of Representatives.  In 2012, he lost reelection in the Republican primary to Jake Highfill.

Committee assignments
Administration and Rules
Legislative Council
Local Government
State Government
Ways and Means

Electoral history

References

External links 
 ErikHelland.com
 Iowa House of Representatives profile
 Interest Group Ratings
 Campaign Finance Information

Republican Party members of the Iowa House of Representatives
Living people
1980 births
Iowa lawyers
People from Johnston, Iowa
Drake University Law School alumni